Jeanne Marie Haney (born September 2, 1958), also known by her married name Jeanne Neville, is an American former competition swimmer who participated in the 1976 Summer Olympics in Montreal, Quebec.  She competed in the preliminary heats of the women's 400-meter individual medley, and finished with the 18th best overall time.

See also
 List of University of California, Los Angeles people

References

1958 births
Living people
American female medley swimmers
Olympic swimmers of the United States
Swimmers at the 1976 Summer Olympics
University of California, Los Angeles alumni
21st-century American women
20th-century American women